Žitište is a town and municipality located in the Central Banat District of the autonomous province of Vojvodina, Serbia. The town has a population of 2,898, while Žitište municipality has 16,786 inhabitants.

Name
In Serbian, the town is known as Žitište (Cyrillic: Житиште), in Romanian as Jitiște or Zitiște, in German as Sankt Georgen an der Bega, and in Hungarian as Bégaszentgyörgy or Begaszentgyörgy.

The Serbian name of the town derived from the Serbian word "žito" ("wheat" in English). Its old names used in Serbian were Begej Sveti Đurađ and Senđurađ.

The Hungarian name of the town derived from the Hungarian family name Szentgyörgyi.

History
Žitište was founded in the 14th century during the administration of the medieval Kingdom of Hungary, under the name of Zenthgyurgh (Szentgyörgyi). In 1660/1666, it was called Senđurađ, which was recorded as a settlement repopulated by ethnic Serbs during Ottoman rule. In the beginning of the 18th century, the settlement was completely abandoned and in 1723 it was recorded as an uninhabited heath.

It was settled again in 1724 by Serb and Romanian settlers. In 1736/37, the settlement had 27 houses. Because of the Austro-Turkish war (1736–1739) and pestilence, the number of inhabitants decreased and in 1740 the population of the settlement numbered 18 houses. In 1753, Begej Sveti Đurađ was settled by 1,000 Serb frontiersmen from Pomorišje, Potisje and Veliki Bečkerek, and in the same year it was recorded on map as a "Serb-inhabited settlement". In 1758, Begej Sveti Đurađ had 45 houses, and in 1773 it had 182 houses. Its church was built in 1758, and it was also used as a school. In 1781, Begej Sveti Đurađ became a property of Isak Kiš (Kis Izsák), who was a trader of Armenian origin.

From 1800 to 1805, the settlement was moved to another location closer to the Begej river. Part of the Serb population moved from the settlement and settled in the Military Frontier, while German colonists settled in Begej Sveti Đurađ instead of them. Begej Sveti Đurađ was a municipality until 1877, when it was joined to the municipality of Veliki Bečkerek. In 1880, the population of the settlement numbered 3,041 people, of whom 1,983 were Catholics, 1,033 were Eastern Orthodox, 19 were Jews, and 6 were others. In accordance with the census made in 1910, the linguistic distribution of the 2,814 inhabitants included 1,454 who spoke German, 1,034 who spoke Serbian and 214 who spoke Hungarian.

In 1931, the population of Begej Sveti Đurađ included 1,318 inhabitants who spoke the German language, 1,055 who spoke the Serbian language, 188 who spoke the Hungarian language, 34 who spoke other Slavic languages, and 94 who spoke other languages. In 1940, population of Begej Sveti Đurađ numbered 3,055 people, of whom 1,642 were Eastern Orthodox, 1,387 were Catholics, 16 were Jews, and 10 were others.

As a consequence of World War II and Axis occupation, the German population left or was evicted from Begej Sveti Đurađ after the war, while 270 Serb families from Bosanska Krajina came to the settlement. In 1947, the name of the settlement was officially changed to Žitište. In 1960, Žitište became a seat of its municipality.

On 2 July 2016, a man killed his wife in a mass shooting that occurred at a local cafe. Four others were also killed and an additional 22 were injured. The shooter was arrested by police after the attack.

Inhabited places

Žitište municipality includes the town of Žitište and the following villages:
 Banatski Dvor
 Banatsko Višnjićevo
 Banatsko Karađorđevo
 Međa
 Novi Itebej
 Ravni Topolovac
 Srpski Itebej
 Torak
 Torda
 Hetin
 Čestereg

Demographics

According to the 2011 census, the population of the municipality of Žitište was 16,841 inhabitants.

Ethnic groups

Municipality
 Serbs = 10,436 (61.97%)
 Hungarians = 3,371 (20.02%)
 Romanians = 1,412 (8.38%)
 Romani = 832 (4.94%)
 Others and undeclared = 790 (4.69%)

Settlements with Serb ethnic majority are: Žitište, Banatsko Višnjićevo, Banatsko Karađorđevo, Međa, Ravni Topolovac, Srpski Itebej, and Čestereg. Settlements with Hungarian ethnic majority are: Novi Itebej (Magyarittabé in Hungarian), Torda, and Hetin (Tamásfalva in Hungarian). The settlement with Romanian ethnic majority is Torak (Begejci). Ethnically mixed settlement with relative Serb majority is Banatski Dvor (Szőllősudvarnok in Hungarian).

Town
According to the 2011 census the town of Žitište had 2,903 inhabitants, including:

 Serbs = 2,511 (86.50%)
 Romani = 175 (6.03%)
 Hungarians = 58 (2.00%)
 Others and undeclared = 159 (5.48%)

Language
Serbian, Hungarian, and Romanian language are officially used by municipal authorities.

Sports 
 KK Sveti Đorđe, basketball team

Gallery

Notable inhabitants
 Radomir Antić

Trivia
In 2007, local authorities unveiled a monument in the centre of the town, dedicated to famous, fictional boxer Rocky Balboa. . In 2009, filmmaker Barry Avrich produced and directed the documentary, "Amerika Idol" about the making and dedication of the Rocky statue.

See also
 List of places in Serbia
 List of cities, towns and villages in Vojvodina
 Municipalities of Serbia
 Central Banat District

References

Further reading
 Ljubica Budać, Begej Sveti Đurađ - Žitište, Žitište, 2000.
 Slobodan Ćurčić, Broj stanovnika Vojvodine, Novi Sad, 1996.

External links

 Official web site of Žitište
 Citizens' Association Rocky Balboa

 
Populated places in Serbian Banat
Populated places in Vojvodina
Municipalities and cities of Vojvodina
Central Banat District